Torben Hansen (born 27 October 1951) is a Danish former professional  footballer who played as a forward. He made one appearance for the Denmark national team in 1973.

References

External links
 

1951 births
Living people
Danish men's footballers
Association football forwards
Denmark international footballers
Holbæk B&I players
FC Bayern Munich footballers
Danish expatriate men's footballers
Danish expatriate sportspeople in Germany
Expatriate footballers in Germany